Maria Sava is a Romanian rower. In the 1986 and 1987 World Rowing Championships, she won gold medals in the women's lightweight single sculls event.

References

See also

Romanian female rowers
World Rowing Championships medalists for Romania
Year of birth missing (living people)
Living people